Hazlehead Bridge railway station was a railway station on the Sheffield, Ashton-under-Lyne and Manchester Railway's Woodhead Line. It served villages scattered over a wide area of South Yorkshire, England, and was adjacent to the bridge over the Huddersfield Road.

History

Following petitions from local inhabitants, a station named Hazlehead was opened on 1 May 1846 (as was a station at Dog Lane, near Dukinfield), and the Huddersfield omnibus served Hazlehead station from August.

The original station was closed in a cost-cutting measure, along with Dukinfield Dog Lane. Oxspring and Thurgoland on 1 November 1847. It was reopened at the start of August 1850, and renamed Hazlehead Bridge on 1 November that year; Bradshaw's Railway Guide continued to use the old name for a few months, but only on the table dealing with down trains (i.e. towards Manchester).

At the station, the line fell in the Sheffield direction on a gradient of 1 in 124 (0.81%). The station was built in stone with the main buildings on the Sheffield-bound (Up) platform and a waiting shelter on the other. A high signal box of the Manchester, Sheffield and Lincolnshire Railway's early type, almost square with hipped roof, controlled the station and the entry to the branch line which served the Hepworth Iron Company's works at Crow Edge.

An accident took place at the station on 20 December 1907 when the lean-to building added to the station only a few years earlier was demolished.

The station closed to passenger traffic on 6 March 1950 and to goods traffic in May 1964.

Notes

References

External links
 Hazlehead Bridge station on navigable 1947 O. S. map

Disused railway stations in Barnsley
Former Great Central Railway stations
Railway stations in Great Britain opened in 1846
Railway stations in Great Britain closed in 1847
Railway stations in Great Britain opened in 1850
Railway stations in Great Britain closed in 1950
Woodhead Line
1846 establishments in England